Hollenback can refer to:
 Bill Hollenback, American football coach
 Hollenback Township, Luzerne County, Pennsylvania